Maljen is a mountain in western Serbia, just south of the city of Valjevo. It is well known as a summer and winter resort. On Maljen is situated resort Divčibare with 3 hotels, 24 holiday camps, two mountain lodges and two ski trails. During summer the slopes of the mountain are covered with flower meadows with white daffodils.

Crna Reka Canyon 

The canyon of the Crna Reka river is located just below the Divčibare resort, to the north. It starts at the Ljuti Krš peak, under which the river springs. The sides are very steep, at some sections almost vertical and are carved in the black magmatic rocks. There is a small waterfall at the entrance into the canyon and, though small, the river creates shallows, falls and ponds.

References

Sources 

 39 Maljen–Suvobor
 Divčibare - pet šafrančića za jod u vazduhu! EkoSfera 2008-07-07

Mountains of Serbia